Jagannath Rao (10 December 1909) was an Indian politician. He was elected to the Lok Sabha, the lower house of the Parliament of India as a member of the Indian National Congress .

References

External links
Official biographical sketch in Parliament of India website

1909 births
1991 deaths
Lok Sabha members from Odisha
India MPs 1957–1962
India MPs 1962–1967
India MPs 1967–1970
India MPs 1971–1977
India MPs 1977–1979
India MPs 1980–1984
India MPs 1984–1989
People from Ganjam district
Politicians from Visakhapatnam
Indian National Congress politicians from Odisha
Indian National Congress politicians from Andhra Pradesh